Kingsley Kennerley (27 December 1913 – 26 June 1982) was an English billiards and snooker player.

Career
In the period from 1937 to 1940 Kennerley enjoyed considerable success as an amateur in both billiards and snooker. He won the English Amateur Billiards Championship in 1937, 1938, 1939 and 1940. In 1938 he travelled to Melbourne and was runner-up in the Empire Amateur Billiards Championship, losing to Bob Marshall. He won the English Amateur Snooker Championship in 1937 and 1940 and was runner-up in 1938 and 1939.

After World War II Kennerley turned professional. He played in the World Snooker Championship most years from 1946 until 1957 when the Championship lapsed. With the revival of snooker, he played in the first three series of Pot Black from 1969 to 1971. He continued to play occasionally in professional snooker events, making his last appearance in a major event in the 1982 Bass and Golden Leisure Classic at the age of 68. Kennerley died later that month.

Snooker performance timeline
Post-war

Modern era

Career titles
Snooker
 News of the World Qualifying Event: 1954/55
 English Amateur Championship: 1937, 1940

Billiards
 English Amateur Billiards Championship: 1937, 1938, 1939, 1940

References

1913 births
1982 deaths
English players of English billiards
English snooker players
Sportspeople from Cheshire
People from Congleton